The satar is a traditional Uyghur long-necked bowed lute. It is used by Uyghur people in Xinjiang, western China, and is an important instrument to play maqams.

Characteristics
The instrument is a long-necked lute, about 140 cm long, with a bowl about 16.5 cm at the widest point, about 15 cm deep. The neck is fretted with 18 tied frets, which may be made of string rather that the inlaid metal frets of western instruments. The soundboard has additionally frets laid on it under the main melody string, approximately 11 or 12 frets.

The satar is strung with between 9 and 17 sympathetic strings which are not played directly but vibrate in reaction to the melody string, in sympathetic resonance.

A single melody string is set apart from the sympathetic strings. This is the string that the musician manipulates on the instrument's neck, fretting it to change the notes as the string is bowed.

On modern instruments, the bridge is set on the soundboard near the bottom at an approximately 45 degree angle, instead of set straight across the soundboard.

A shorter version, about 120 centimeters long, is known as the alto sataer (中音萨它尔).

Tuning
The main string of the instrument is set in relation to the lead singer's voice, singing the 12 maqams. The string is set approximately to:
 c-c2 or d-d2

For an instrument using 12 sympathetic strings, the strings may be tuned:
 G, c, d, e, g, a, c1, d1, e1, g1, a1, c2

or 
 c, d, e, g, a, c1, d1, e1, g1, a1, c2, d2.

See also
 Setar
 Chinese music
 List of Chinese musical instruments

Notes

References

External links 
Video. Trio playing Uyghur instruments; satar is on the far right.
Video. Satar playing with drum.
Chinese musical instruments
Culture in Xinjiang
Uyghur musical instruments